The Mother's International School (MIS) is a private secondary school in New Delhi, India. It is an establishment of the Sri Aurobindo Education Society, an agency of the Sri Aurobindo Ashram. It shares its campus with the New Delhi branch of the Ashram. The school is an English-medium co-educational institution affiliated to the Central Board of Secondary Education (CBSE).

In 2001, Outlook's "C-Fore Best School Survey" had ranked MIS as the best school in Delhi. It won News Wiz 2018 Episode 7.

The school shares a campus with other institutions including the alternative education school, Mirambika. Mirambika and The Mother's International often collaborate to celebrate certain events like Mirra Alfassa's birthday. The schools share the same sports ground on campus. The campus also hosts a bakery, iron-work unit, wood-work unit, candle-making and handmade paper unit, vocational training centre, and book store. The school also has a "Pre-Primary Wing" after the closing of Mira Nursery.

History

The school was founded on 23 April 1956 by the founders Mr Surendra Jauhar and Mr Nathaniel Pearson, with the blessings of The Mother, Mirra Alfassa, a spiritualist, the spiritual partner and collaborator of Aurobindo.

The school's motto "More True, Forever More True" was given by the Mirra Alfassa and the school's emblem portrays a bird in flight rising towards heaven. When asked about the date of the school's opening, the Mother replied "23456". And as the only possible date was 23 April 1956, it was this day that the school first opened.

When the school started out, a batch (or a grade) was of about 15 children, but today a batch has 180 students. The school has three wings, the Pre-Primary, Primary and Secondary.

Enrollment
The school has a student population of about 2,400 pupils with an average section size of 30-35 students. Each grade has five sections, A-E, aside from grade 11 and 12, which have sections till F.

Academics

The school teaches four languages: English, Hindi, Sanskrit and French. It also teaches mathematics, science and social studies till Class 10. There are three main streams for study beyond Class 10: Science, Commerce and Humanities.

For classes 1 and 2, a single teacher and assistant teacher teach all the subjects; the 3rd grade onwards, there is a different teacher for each subject, with one of them being the class teacher. The student/teacher ratio is approximately 40.

See also
Integral education
The Doon school
St. Xavier's Collegiate School
Modern School
Bharatiya Vidya Bhavan

References

External links

The Mother's International School, website
 http://epaper.timesofindia.com/Repository/ml.asp?Ref=VE9JQkcvMjAxMC8wOS8wNSNBcjAxMjAw

Schools in Delhi
Educational institutions established in 1956
Schools affiliated with the Sri Aurobindo Ashram
1956 establishments in Delhi